Sarteneja is the largest fishing community and the second largest village in Belize. It recorded a population of 3,500 according to a 2016 estimate. The name Sarteneja is a Castilian distortion of its original Mayan name Tza-ten-a-ha, which means 'water between the rocks'.

Sarteneja is on the Sarteneja Peninsula, approximately forty miles by road from Orange Walk Town and is near the privately owned Shipstern Conservation & Management Area. The village's economy is based primarily on fishing for lobster, conch, and finfish. There are many farmers, particularly retired fishermen who farm. Tourism is becoming increasingly significant as a source of income or at least as another alternative livelihood for those who no longer fish.

Most of Sarteneja's inhabitants are of Yucatec Maya and Mestizo ancestry..

Boatbuilding 
Sarteneja is home to shipwrights who are still active, having built most of the traditional fishing boat fleet (visible in Haulover Creek in Belize city) and many of the tourist sailing boats, most notably: Sirena Azul (San Pedro), Ragga King, Ragga Gial, Blackhawk (Caye Caulker), Brujula (Hopkins), and Zayann. One of the best known boat builders of Sarteneja is Evaristo Verde (Barich). Verde built more than 17 boats during his lifetime.

The Sarteneja Easter Regatta 
Sarteneja is known for its Easter Regatta, which takes place every year on Easter Sunday when most of the village's fleet has returned during the fishing season break.

Gallery

References

Populated places in Corozal District
Corozal South East